ES PEVM (ЕС ПЭВМ) was a Soviet clone of the IBM PC in 1980s. The ES PEVM models lineup also included analogues of IBM PC XT, IBM PC AT, IBM XT/370.

The computers and software were adapted in Minsk, Belarus, at the Scientific Research Institute of Electronic Computer Machines (НИИ ЭВМ). 

They were manufactured in Minsk as well, at Minsk Production Group for Computing Machinery (Минское производственное объединение вычислительной техники (МПО ВТ)).

Description 

The first models of ES PEVM (ES-1840, ES-1841, ES-1842), unlike the IBM PC, had two units: a system unit and a floppy drives unit. These models used a backplane instead of the main board. Although the system bus was compatible with ISA bus, it used a different type of connector, so the IBM PC expansion cards could not be installed in ES PEVM.
Later models (ES-1843, ES-1849 etc.) were fully compatible with IBM PC XT and IBM PC AT.

Unlike IBM PC using the Intel 8088 processor, the early ES PEVM models used K1810VM86 processor with a 16-bit bus and a clock frequency of 5 MHz. The processor was placed on a separate board. Early versions of the board did not have a socket for the floating point coprocessor.

The following boards were produced for ES-1840 and ES-1841:
 CPU board (containing 54 chips). It was installed in every configuration of the computer.
 128 KiB RAM board. It was installed in early models of ES PEVM.
 512 KiB RAM board (containing 110 chips). Variants with 256 KiB or 128 Kib were available.
 MDA adapter board (containing 91 chips). It was built using the Bulgarian CM607 chip (MC6845 clone).
 CGA adapter board (containing 94 chips).
 Floppy-drive adapter board (containing 32 chips). It was built using the Bulgarian CM609 chip (Intel 8272 clone).
 Serial interface adapter board (containing 56 chips). It was electrically incompatible with the IBM PC COM port and was not supported in the BIOS.

Volume of production for a number of models:

Software 
The computers were shipped with AlphaDOS, an entirely Russified version of MS-DOS/PC DOS 2.x and 3.x. All commands were entered in Russian, for example, СМЕНКАТ for CHDIR. Files and file extensions were also in Russian, such as АТРИБ.ИСП for ATTRIB.EXE. The operating system used the main code page, hardwired into the display ROM; it was compatible neither with CP 866 nor CP 855, although partially with ISO/IEC 8859-5.

Reliability 
Early models of ES PEVM were prone to failures due to manufacturing defects. The mean time between failures MTBF was around 350 hours.

See also 
 History of computer hardware in Eastern Bloc countries
 ES EVM

References

IBM PC compatibles
Science and technology in Belarus
Ministry of Radio Industry (USSR) computers